Turbulence (born Sheldon Campbell on 11 January 1980) is a Jamaican reggae artist. He is a self-proclaimed member of the Rastafari movement. He was discovered in 1999 by Philip "Fatis" Burrell. He has released a number of albums including I Believe, United, Notorious - The Album, Songs of Solomon, Triumphantly, Join Us and Hail The King and was featured in an episode of the BBC documentary series Storyville. He is also known for his song "Blood dem out" which was featured on a highly profiled freestyle ski movie called "Show and Prove".

Rise Up documentary
Turbulence was featured as one of three main acts in the 2007 documentary film Rise Up, which explores the world of underground music in Jamaica. The film documents Turbulence's rise to prominence as an internationally recognized and nationally celebrated reggae artist, and highlights the political and socially active nature of his music.

Rise Up has screened at numerous film festivals including IDFA and Hot Docs, and the film won the Best Music Documentary category at the AFI/Discovery Channel Silverdocs Festival. The film also aired on the BBC and enjoyed a well received theatrical debut in Jamaica, where it was reviewed by the Jamaican Observer as the "Rise of a new Classic". Throughout the film, Turbulence voices the problems of post-colonial corruption, poverty, and violence in Jamaica.

The breakout single, "Notorious", brought Turbulence international acclaim. First released in 2004 on the Scallawah riddim, "Notorious" rose to Number 1 on local and international Reggae/Dancehall charts in Jamaica, New York City, London, Toronto and Japan in 2005, bolstered by the supporting music video by Rise Up director and cinematographer Luciano Blotta. The track was re-released as the feature track of the Notorious album in 2006.
Turbulence went to another number one song with a collaboration featuring Reggae's new voice and Rastafarian ambassador Khalilah Rose.The song Unite and Be Strong charted on Argentina's urban mixx for ten weeks.

Discography

Albums

References

External links
 - Turbulence Official Facebook 
 MPLS Dance Hall - THC Muzik

Living people
1980 births
Jamaican reggae musicians
Converts to the Rastafari movement
Jamaican Rastafarians
VP Records artists